Centrolabrus is a small genus of wrasses from the family Labridae which are native to the eastern Atlantic Ocean.

Species
The currently recognized species in this genus are:

 Centrolabrus exoletus (Linnaeus, 1758) (rock cook)
 Centrolabrus melanocercus (Risso, 1810)

References

 
Labridae
Marine fish genera
Taxa named by Albert Günther